Lithospermum azuayensis is a flowering plant of the family Boraginaceae found in Ecuador.

References

External links

azuayensis
Flora of Ecuador